Philip Roth: The Biography is a 2021 book by biographer Blake Bailey. It is the authorized biography of American novelist Philip Roth (1933–2018). It was first published on April 6, 2021, by W. W. Norton & Company. Norton, however, later cancelled publication of the book. Three weeks later, in May 2021, Skyhorse Publishing announced that it would release paperback, ebook, and audiobook versions of the biography.

Background 
In 2004, American novelist Philip Roth enlisted Ross Miller, a professor at the University of Connecticut and nephew of playwright Arthur Miller, to write an authorized biography of Roth. In 2009, however, they mutually agreed to abandon their arrangement.
 Roth and Miller, who were close friends, had a falling out over the direction in which the project was going. Roth reportedly began interfering in Miller's process, including manipulating his interviews.

Blake Bailey, an American writer from Oklahoma, previously published biographies of novelists Richard Yates, John Cheever, and Charles Jackson. After completing his biography of Jackson, Bailey approached Philip Roth in the spring of 2012. In June 2012, Roth and Bailey signed a collaboration agreement. The agreement granted Bailey unrestricted and exclusive access to the author's complete archives, including his unpublished works and personal correspondence. Roth, who was 79 years old at the time, made himself available for extensive interviews conducted by Bailey. Roth also assisted in encouraging friends and family to cooperate in the process. The deal was first reported in The New York Times on September 5, 2012. On September 28, 2012, it was reported that W. W. Norton & Company acquired the rights to the book. At the time, Bailey estimated that the biography would take him eight to ten years to finish writing.

Bailey spent years researching and organizing content for the book, writing a 35-page outline and envisioning each paragraph before the writing process. He officially started writing the book in December 2017. He referenced from a plethora of Roth's papers and Roth's donated materials at the Library of Congress. He was also given a 300-page chronology written by Roth and a copy of Roth's unpublished book Notes for My Biographer. Bailey also inherited Ross Miller's taped interviews; however, Miller would not respond to Bailey's communications. Bailey also referenced from his own interviews which he conducted with 150 people, in addition to the numerous interviews with Roth. He also had a very brief communication with Claire Bloom. In his first interviews with Roth, Bailey expressed his desire to maintain a professional relationship to not repeat the "disturbing" relationship he had with Ross Miller. Bailey demanded freedom to quote from Roth's documents, and that Roth and his team were not to edit his manuscript for any purposes except for factual accuracy. Although Roth at times attempted to sway the narrative in his own direction, Bailey "quietly" went his own way.

Roth died of congestive heart failure on May 22, 2018, at the age of 85.

Publication 
The book was published in the United States by W. W. Norton & Company on April 6, 2021, and in the United Kingdom by Jonathan Cape on April 8, 2021. An audiobook, narrated George Guidall, was released the same day by Recorded Books. The book debuted at number fifteen on The New York Times nonfiction best-seller list for the week ending April 10, 2021.

Cancellation
In April 2021, Bailey was dropped by his agency, the Story Factory, following allegations of sexual misconduct made in the comments section of a literary blog; Bailey denies the allegations. In a statement to the Associated Press on April 21 by W. W. Norton & Company, the publisher announced that it decided to pause the shipping and promotion of Philip Roth: The Biography "pending any further information that may emerge." On April 28, W. W. Norton announced that it is taking the book out of print. The same day, Recorded Books announced that it would be withdrawing the audiobook edition from release.

On May 17, 2021, Skyhorse Publishing announced that it would release a paperback, ebook, and audiobook versions of the biography. The e-book edition was published on May 26, 2021. The paperback version was published on June 29, 2021.

Reception 
Philip Roth: The Biography received favorable reviews, with a cumulative "Positive" rating at the review aggregator website Book Marks.

Alexander C. Kafka of The Washington Post praised the book for being "conversationally readable" despite its length, and wrote that "no one writing about Roth will be able to sidestep this foundational biography." In its starred review, Kirkus Reviews called it an "outstanding" biography, praising Bailey's "evenhanded" treatment of Roth's books and personal flaws. Publishers Weekly, in its starred review, praised Bailey's "consistently luminous, humorous prose" and called it "as dynamic and gripping as any of Roth's own fictions."

In a negative review, Parul Sehgal of The New York Times felt the author failed his subject and called the book a "narrow portrait of a wide life." Sehgal criticized Bailey's "sprawling" focus on Roth's personal life and his reticence on Roth's literary work and style: "Roth's own writing was full of provocations on the art of biography, full of masks and veils and alter egos, obsessed with plucking apart the idea of a self. Bailey avoids it all, offering readings of the most tepid kind, primarily noticing biographical correspondences, most of them familiar by now."

References 

2021 non-fiction books
Philip Roth
American biographies
Biographies about writers
W. W. Norton & Company books
Cancelled books
English-language books